Jurimetrics is the application of quantitative methods, and often especially probability and statistics, to law. In the United States, the journal Jurimetrics is published by the American Bar Association and Arizona State University. The Journal of Empirical Legal Studies is another publication that emphasizes the statistical analysis of law.

The term was coined in 1949 by Lee Loevinger in his article "Jurimetrics: The Next Step Forward". Showing the influence of Oliver Wendell Holmes, Jr., Loevinger quoted Holmes' celebrated phrase that:

The first work on this topic is attributed to Nicolaus I Bernoulli in his doctoral dissertation De Usu Artis Conjectandi in Jure, written in 1709.

Common methods 

 Bayesian inference
Causal inference
Instrumental variables
 Design of experiments
 Vital for epidemiological studies
 Generalized linear models
 Ordinary least squares, logistic regression, Poisson regression
 Meta-analysis
Probability distributions
Binomial distribution, hypergeometric distribution, normal distribution
Survival analysis
Kaplan-Meier estimator, proportional hazards model, Weibull distribution

Applications 

Accounting fraud detection (Benford's law)
Airline deregulation
Analysis of police stops (Negative binomial regression)
Ban the Box legislation and subsequent impact on job applications
Statistical discrimination (economics)
Calorie labeling mandates and food consumption
Risk compensation
Challenging election results (Hypergeometric distribution)
Condorcet's jury theorem
Cost-benefit analysis of renewable portfolio standards for greenhouse gas abatement
Effect of compulsory schooling on future earnings
Effect of corporate board size on firm performance
Effect of damage caps on medical malpractice claims
Effect of a fiduciary standard on financial advice
False conviction rate of inmates sentenced to death
Legal evidence (Bayesian network)
Impact of "pattern-or-practice" investigations on crime
Legal informatics
Ogden tables
Optimal stopping of clinical trials
Peremptory challenges in jury selection
Personality predictors of antisocial behavior
Predictive policing
Predictors of criminal recidivism
Prevalence of Caesarean delivery and malpractice claims risk
Prosecutor's fallacy (People v. Collins)
Reference class problem

Gender quotas on corporate boards 
In 2018, California's legislature passed Senate Bill 826, which requires all publicly held corporations based in the state to have a minimum number of women on their board of directors. Boards with five or fewer members must have at least two women, while boards with six or more members must have at least three women.

Using the binomial distribution, we may compute what the probability is of violating the rule laid out in Senate Bill 826 by the number of board members. We will assume that .

Depending on the number of board members, we are trying compute the cumulative distribution function:With these formulas, we are able to compute the probability of violating Senate Bill 826 by chance:

As Ilya Somin points out, a significant percentage of firms - without any history of sex discrimination - could be in violation of the law.

In more male-dominated industries, such as technology, there could be an even greater imbalance. Suppose that instead of parity in general, the probability that a person who is qualified for board service is female is 40%; this is likely to be a high estimate, given the predominance of males in the technology industry. Then the probability of violating Senate Bill 826 by chance may be recomputed as:

Bayesian analysis of evidence 

If we take  to be some criminal behavior and  a criminal complaint or accusation, Bayes' theorem allows us to determine the conditional probability of a crime being committed. More sophisticated analyses of evidence can be undertaken with the use of Bayesian networks.

Screening of drug users, mass shooters, and terrorists 
In recent years, there has been a growing interest in the use of screening tests to identify drug users on welfare, potential mass shooters, and terrorists. The efficacy of screening tests can be analyzed using Bayes' theorem.

Suppose that there is some binary screening procedure for an action  that identifies a person as testing positive  or negative  for the action. Bayes' theorem tells us that the conditional probability of taking action , given a positive test result, is:For any screening test, we must be cognizant of its sensitivity and specificity. The screening test has sensitivity  and specificity . The sensitivity and specificity can be analyzed using concepts from the standard theory of statistical hypothesis testing:

 Sensitivity is equal to the statistical power , where  is the type II error rate

Therefore, the form of Bayes' theorem that is pertinent to us is:Suppose that we have developed a test with sensitivity and specificity of 99%, which is likely to be higher than most real-world tests. We can examine several scenarios to see how well this hypothetical test works:

 We screen welfare recipients for cocaine use. The base rate in the population is approximately 1.5%, assuming no differences in use between welfare recipients and the general population.
 We screen men for the possibility of committing mass shootings or terrorist attacks. The base rate is assumed to be 0.01%.

With these base rates and the hypothetical values of sensitivity and specificity, we may calculate the posterior probability that a positive result indicates the individual will actually engage in each of the actions:

Even with very high sensitivity and specificity, the screening tests only return posterior probabilities of 60.1% and 0.98% respectively for each action. Under more realistic circumstances, it is likely that screening would prove even less useful than under these hypothetical conditions. The problem with any screening procedure for rare events is that it is very likely to be too imprecise, which will identify too many people of being at risk of engaging in some undesirable action.

Jurimetrics and law and economics 
The difference between jurimetrics and law and economics is that jurimetrics investigates legal questions from a probabilistic/statistical point of view, while law and economics addresses legal questions using standard microeconomic analysis. A synthesis of these fields is possible through the use of econometrics (statistics for economic analysis) and other quantitative methods to answer relevant legal matters.  As an example, the Columbia University scholar Edgardo Buscaglia published several peer-reviewed articles by using a joint jurimetrics and law and economics approach.

See also 

Bayesian inference
Computational criminology
Disparate impact#Statistical criticism of disparate impact
Forensic statistics
Law and economics
Quantitative methods in criminology
Rules of evidence for expert testimony
Daubert standard
Frye standard
Simpson's paradox#UC Berkeley gender bias
 Survival analysis

References

Further reading 

Angrist, Joshua D.; Pischke, Jörn-Steffen (2009). Mostly Harmless Econometrics: An Empiricist's Companion. Princeton, NJ: Princeton University Press. . 
Borenstein, Michael; Hedges, Larry V.; Higgins, Julian P.T.; Rothstein, Hannah R. (2009). Introduction to Meta-Analysis. Hoboken, NJ: John Wiley & Sons. .
Finkelstein, Michael O.; Levin, Bruce (2015). Statistics for Lawyers. Statistics for Social and Behavioral Sciences (3rd ed.). New York, NY: Springer. .
Hosmer, David W.; Lemeshow, Stanley; May, Susanne (2008). Applied Survival Analysis: Regression Modeling of Time-to-Event Data. Wiley-Interscience (2nd ed.). Hoboken, NJ: John Wiley & Sons. .
McCullagh, Peter; Nelder, John A. (1989). Generalized Linear Models. Monographs on Statistics and Applied Probability (2nd ed.). Boca Raton, FL: Chapman & Hall/CRC. .

External links 
 Bernoulli (1709). The use of the Art of conjecturing in Law.
 Kadane, J.B. (2006). Misuse of Bayesian Statistics in Court, CHANCE, 19, 2, 38-40.
 Stern & Kadane (2014). Compensating for the loss of a chance. Department of Statistics, Carnegie Mellon University.
 Jurimetrics, The Journal of Law, Science, and Technology
Journal of Empirical Legal Studies

Metrics
Philosophy of law
1940s neologisms
1949 introductions